are an idol group developed by Avex Trax and Ishimori Productions to commemorate the Kamen Rider Series' 40th anniversary in 2011. Each of the group's current members represent one of the protagonists of the Kamen Rider Series. The group made their premiere at an event featuring members of Columbia Music Entertainment's Project.R group, the musical collaboration who provides music for the Super Sentai series. The group's debut songs were played on the DJ HURRY KENN Ride the Groove Internet radio program, the successor to the Wind Wave radio programs from the Kamen Rider W series. The group's debut single is "Let's Go RiderKick 2011", serving as the theme song for OOO, Den-O, All Riders: Let's Go Kamen Riders with "Koi no Rider Kick" and "Heart no Henshin Belt" as the single's B-sides. A second single titled "KAMEN RIDER V3" was released on August 3, 2011 with the PV having  a cameo by Hiroshi Tanahashi.

Members 
: Kamen Rider OOO; November 2010–present
: Kamen Rider Wizard; September 2012–present 
: Kamen Rider Gaim; October 2013–present

Former Members 
: Kamen Rider Ryuki; November 2010-graduated December 2011
: Kamen Rider Kiva; November 2010-graduated April 2015 
: Kamen Rider Blade; November 2010-graduated January 2016
: Kamen Rider Den-O; November 2010-graduated January 2016
: Kamen Rider Fourze; November 2011–graduated March 2017
: Kamen Rider Faiz; November 2015–graduated March 2019

Timeline

Discography

Albums
 alteration - March 20, 2013
 exploded - March 19, 2014
 SUPER BEST - April 1, 2015
 invincible - August 23, 2017
 030804-01 ("Zero One") - September 4, 2019
 starting point - May 20, 2021
 Re:incarnation - May 19, 2022

Singles
 Let's Go Rider Kick 2011 
 KAMEN RIDER V3 
 "Saite" (咲いて, "Saite" "Blooming") 
 Last Engage 
 Just The Beginning
 Go Get'Em 
 SSS ~Shock Shocker Shockest~ 
 E-X-A (Exciting × Attitude) 
 Break The Shell 
 UNLIMITED DRIVE 
 Next Stage 
 Rush N' Crash/Movin'on 
 Just You & Me 
 Time Of Victory
 Build-Up

References

External links
 
Kamen Rider Girls

Kamen Rider
Avex Group artists
Japanese girl groups
Japanese idol groups
Japanese pop music groups
Musical groups established in 2010
2010 establishments in Japan
Musical quintets